Rolf Wembstad (31 August 1927 – 11 October 2013) was a Norwegian footballer and official. He played for the top-league club SK Brann his entire career, spanning from 1947 and 1957 and including the 1950 Norwegian Football Cup where Brann became runners-up. He later served as chairman of SK Brann's football section, and from 1981 to 1983 as chairman of SK Brann. He was given honorary membership of SK Brann. He died in October 2013.

References

1927 births
2013 deaths
Footballers from Bergen
Norwegian footballers
SK Brann players
Eliteserien players
Norwegian sports executives and administrators

Association footballers not categorized by position